Daniel Unger (born 22 March 1978) is a German triathlete who was the 2007 ITU Triathlon World Champion.

At the 2008 Olympics in Beijing, he finished in 6th place with a time of 1:49:43.78, 50.5 seconds behind the winner Jan Frodeno.

References

External links
 Official website
 Athlete Biography at Beijing 2008

1978 births
Living people
People from Ravensburg
Sportspeople from Tübingen (region)
German male triathletes
Olympic triathletes of Germany
Triathletes at the 2008 Summer Olympics